Robert Humphreys (August 20, 1893December 31, 1977) was briefly a member of the United States Senate from Kentucky.

After service in World War I Humphreys worked as a registered pharmacist in the retail drug business in Mayfield, Kentucky and later at Frankfort, Kentucky. He served in the Kentucky House of Representatives in 1920 and in the Kentucky Senate 1932-1936. He served as President Pro Tempore of the Kentucky Senate in 1934 and as clerk of three senate sessions 1936-1942. He served as Kentucky highway commissioner 1936-1940. During World War II he served as a captain in the Medical Corps, 1943-1945. He again served as state highway commissioner 1955-1956. Then he resigned to accept appointment to the United States Senate on June 21, 1956 as a Democrat to fill the vacancy caused by the death of Alben Barkley. He served in the Senate from June 21, 1956 to November 6, 1956. Humphreys did not seek election to the Senate, opting instead to serve only for the brief time he was appointed.

Sources

1893 births
1977 deaths
Politicians from Frankfort, Kentucky
People from Mayfield, Kentucky
Democratic Party members of the Kentucky House of Representatives
Democratic Party Kentucky state senators
Democratic Party United States senators from Kentucky
Hampden–Sydney College alumni
American people of Welsh descent
People from Hickman County, Kentucky
20th-century American politicians